Bolsheustyikinskoye (Olo Iqtamaq) is a rural locality (a selo) and the administrative centre of Mechetlinsky District in Bashkortostan, Russia. It is located near the Ay River. Population:

References

Notes

Sources

Rural localities in Mechetlinsky District